Auke Andriesz Stellingwerf (1635 – 13 June 1665) was a Dutch admiral who served the Admiralty of Friesland and died while commanding a squadron in the battle of Lowestoft.

17th-century Dutch military personnel
1635 births
1665 deaths
Admirals of the navy of the Dutch Republic
Dutch naval personnel of the Anglo-Dutch Wars
People from Harlingen, Netherlands